Campbell County Schools is a school district operating schools in Campbell County, Kentucky in Greater Cincinnati. Its headquarters are in Alexandria.

It serves portions of the county, including Alexandria, California, Claryville, Cold Spring, Crestview, Highland Heights, Mentor, and Wilder.

In 2019, the county board of education voted to accept the merger with Silver Grove Independent Schools. The merger was effective July 1, 2019.

Schools
 Campbell County High School
 Campbell County Middle School
Elementary schools:
 Campbell Ridge Elementary
 Donald E. Cline Elementary
 Grant's Lick Elementary
 Crossroads Elementary
 John W. Reiley Elementary
Alternative:
 Campbell County Central/Day Treatment

References

External links
 Campbell County Schools

School districts in Kentucky
Education in Campbell County, Kentucky